David Trott or Dave Trott could refer to: 

Dave Trott (politician) (born 1960), American politician
Dave Trott (advertising executive) (born 1947), English copywriter